United States v. Morgan, 118 F. Supp. 621 (S.D.N.Y. 1953), more commonly referred to as the Investment Bankers Case was a multi-year antitrust case brought by the United States Justice Department against seventeen of the most prominent Wall Street investment banking firms, known as the Wall Street Seventeen.

Facts
The Justice Department filed suit against the firms in 1947 claimed that the leading investment banking firms had combined, conspired and agreed, in violation of the Sherman Antitrust Act, to control and monopolize the U.S. Securities markets.

The 17 Wall Street firms named as defendants in the case, later known as the "Wall Street Seventeen" were as follows:
Morgan Stanley & Co.
Kidder Peabody
Goldman Sachs
White Weld & Co.
Dillon Read & Co.
Drexel & Co.
First Boston Corporation
Smith Barney & Co.
Kuhn, Loeb & Co.
Lehman Brothers
Blyth & Co.
Eastman Dillon & Co.
Harriman Ripley
Stone & Webster Securities Corp.
Harris, Hall & Co.
Glore, Forgan & Co.
Union Securities Corp.

Excluded from the case were a number of prominent Wall Street firms including Bache & Co., Halsey Stuart & Co., Merrill Lynch, Pierce, Fenner & Beane and Salomon Brothers & Hutzler among others.

Judgment
The case, which was brought to trial in the Southern District of New York in 1952 was presided over by the controversial and politically conservative Federal judge Harold Medina, who had become internationally infamous for his rulings in the 1949 Smith Act trials of Communist Party leaders. In October 1953, after a year-long trial, Medina found in favor of the investment banking firms. In his judgment, he saw "a constantly changing panorama of competition among the seventeen defendant firms."

See also
Pujo Committee
Pecora Commission

References

External links
 
Whither Are We Bound?.  TIME Magazine, October 26, 1953

1953 in United States case law
United States antitrust case law
United States District Court for the Southern District of New York cases
History of banking in the United States